Victor Johansson (born 13 September 1998) is a Swedish swimmer. He competed in the men's 200 metre freestyle event at the 2017 World Aquatics Championships. In 2019, he represented Sweden at the 2019 Summer Universiade in Naples, Italy and he won the gold medal in the men's 1500 metre freestyle event.

References

External links
 

1998 births
Living people
Place of birth missing (living people)
Universiade medalists in swimming
Universiade gold medalists for Sweden
Medalists at the 2019 Summer Universiade
Swedish male freestyle swimmers
European Games competitors for Sweden
Swimmers at the 2015 European Games
Swimmers at the 2020 Summer Olympics
Olympic swimmers of Sweden
USC Trojans men's swimmers